Chak Bhola is a village situated in the district of Gujrat, Pakistan.

References

Villages in Gujrat District